Bog snorkelling is a sporting event where competitors aim to complete two consecutive lengths of a  water-filled trench cut through a peat bog in the shortest time possible, wearing traditional snorkel, diving mask and flippers. They complete the course without swimming, relying on flipper power alone.

The current world record was set by Neil Rutter in 2018, with a time of 1 min 18.81 seconds. The women's world record stands at 1 minute 22.56 seconds by Kirsty Johnson in 2014. Both were set at the Waen Rhydd bog, Llanwrtyd Wells in Wales.

Rules
A water-filled trench  in length must be cut through a peat bog by the organisers.
Competitors must wear snorkels, masks and flippers.
A wetsuit is not compulsory, but is often worn.
Bog snorkelling competitors must traverse two consecutive lengths totalling  in the shortest time possible.
The course must be completed without using conventional swimming strokes, relying on flipper power alone.

World Record history

World Bog Snorkelling Championship
The World Bog Snorkelling Championship, first held in 1985, takes place every August Bank Holiday in the dense Waen Rhydd peat bog, near Llanwrtyd Wells in mid Wales. Competitors travel from as far afield as Australia, Belgium, Canada, China, England, Finland, Germany, Ireland, New Zealand, Poland, Russia, South Africa, South Korea, Wales and the US.

Other bog snorkelling events take place, particularly in Wales, but also in Australia, Ireland, and Sweden. These include the Bog Snorkelling Triathlon, which consists of a 120 yard (110 metre) snorkel, a 19 mile (31 kilometre) bike ride and a 7 mile (12 km) run.

Proceeds from the World Championship go to a local charity each year. Past recipients include the Cystic Fibrosis Trust (2005) and the Motor Neurone Association (2006). The 2006 charity was chosen in memory of the Green Events treasurer, Ron Skilton, who died in December 2005.

Results

Bog snorkelling in popular culture
2019 - Royal Mail issue a collectable stamps edition of UK Weird and Wonderful Customs which includes Bog snorkelling at Llanwrtyd Wells, World Gurning Championship at Egremont, Up Helly Aa in Lerwick, Burning the Clocks in Brighton, 'Obby 'Oss festival in Padstow, Samhain Celtic festival (Halloween) at Derry, Horn Dance at Abbots Bromley and Cheese-Rolling at Cooper's Hill.

References

External links

 Mountain Bike Bog Snorkelling
 The more recently established Bog Snorkelling Triathlon
 Bog snorkelling images (BBC News)
 Online Bog Snorkelling Challenge (BBC News)
 New champion for bog snorkellers (BBC News)
 Bog snorkellers take the plunge (BBC News)

Bogs
Water sports